Ladaenti Houmadi (born 1983 in Chandra) is a Comorian politician.

Houmadi was appointed Minister of Employment, Youth, and Sports in 2018 in the government of Azali Assoumani, which she left in June 2019.

Houmadi has been a member of the Assembly of the Union of the Comoros for Cuvette in Anjouan since 2020.

References

Living people
21st-century Comorian politicians
1983 births
Members of the Assembly of the Union of the Comoros
21st-century Comorian women politicians
Government ministers of the Comoros
Women government ministers of the Comoros
People from Anjouan